Vuhledar (transcribed Ugledar; both names meaning 'gift of coal', referring to its coal mining industry) is a town in Donetsk Oblast (province) of Ukraine. At the beginning of 2022, its population was

History 
In the 1960s, during the Soviet era, the mining basin south of the major industrial city of Donetsk was beginning to be developed. The settlement that would later be known as Vuhledar was founded around the Pivdennodonbaska 1 coal mine, originally under the name of "Pivdennyi Donetsk", meaning "South Donetsk". There were initially plans to develop it into a major industrial city with the same name as the mine, inhabited by a hundred thousand inhabitants, with ten mines, but by the 1970s, the development of coal reserves in the southern Donbas basin was less promising than in the Kuzbass, so it only grew to the size of a small town. In 1969, the village was renamed Vuhledar, and in 1991, it received city status.

Russo-Ukrainian War 

After the beginning of the War in Donbas in 2014, the city appears to have been strongly fortified because of fighting between the Armed Forces of Ukraine and Russian-backed separatists from the Donetsk People's Republic.

On February 24, 2022, Russia launched a full-scale invasion of Ukraine. On the day the invasion began, Vuhledar was hit by a Russian ballistic missile carrying a cluster munition. The missile struck outside a hospital and killed four civilians and injured another 10. Russian forces attempted to push towards the town throughout 2022 without success.

In early 2023, Russian forces attacked Vuhledar anew. In February 2023, Vuhledar's deputy mayor Maksym Verbovsky stated that Vuhledar "was destroyed", with "one hundred percent of the buildings damaged;" fewer than 500 civilians, and only one child, remained in the town once populated with 15,000 residents.

Economy

The Pivdennodonbaska 1 coal mine in Vuhledar is one of the largest coal reserves in Ukraine, having estimated reserves of 69.3 million tonnes. The Pivdennodonbaska 3 mine, also in Vuhledar, is even larger, with estimated reserves of 156.9 million tonnes.

Demographics
As of the 2001 Ukrainian Census, its population was 17,440, and subdivided into:

Ethnicity
 Ukrainians: 63.1%
 Russians: 33.1%
 Belarusians: 1.0%

Language
Russian: 70.8%
Ukrainian: 28.2%
Belarusian: 0.1%

Notable people
Dmytro Khomchenovskyi (born 16 April 1990), footballer
Anastasiya Lysenko (born 2 December 1995), weightlifter

References

Cities in Donetsk Oblast
Populated places established in the Ukrainian Soviet Socialist Republic
Cities of regional significance in Ukraine
Volnovakha Raion
Destroyed cities